Major-General (Edward) Alexander (Wilmot) Williams CB CBE MC (8 June 1910 – 2 November 1994) was a British Army officer who served in the Second World War and later commanded the 2nd Division.

Military career
Alexander Williams was born on 8 June 1910 in Herringston House, Dorchester, Dorset, England, the son of Captain Berkeley Cole Wilmot Williams, a British Army officer, and Hon. Mrs Winifred Mary Williams, the elder daughter of the second Lord Addington. He was educated at Eton College before attending the Royal Military College, Sandhurst, from where he was commissioned as a second lieutenant into the King's Royal Rifle Corps (KRRC) on 28 August 1930. He was posted to the 2nd Battalion, KRRC, then serving in Tidworth, Wiltshire, before the battalion moved in 1932 to Northern Ireland. Promoted to lieutenant on 28 August 1933, the 2nd KRRC returned to England in 1935. Williams, along with the battalion, now commanded by Lieutenant-Colonel Evelyn Barker, was sent to Palestine in 1936, following the outbreak of the Arab revolt, before again returning to England, in 1937, where it was converted into a motorised infantry battalion and became part of the Mobile Division (from April 1939 1st Armoured Division), under Major-General Alan Brooke. In January 1939 Williams, who on 28 August 1938 was promoted to captain, was made adjutant to the 2nd KRRC, now commanded by Lieutenant-Colonel Thomas Wilson after Barker was promoted to command a brigade.

He was still adjutant upon the outbreak of the Second World War in September. By then the battalion, alongside the 1st Rifle Brigade (The Prince Consort's Own), formed the infantry component of the 1st Support Group, under Brigadier Frederick Morgan, of the 1st Armoured Division, now under Major-General Roger Evans. Instead of being sent to France to join the British Expeditionary Force (BEF), however, the division remained in the United Kingdom. In late April 1940 the 2nd KRRC, now under Lieutenant-Colonel Euan Miller, and the 1st Rifle Brigade were transferred to the 30th Infantry Brigade, under Brigadier Claude Nicholson, and was initially to be sent to Norway to fight in the Norwegian Campaign. However, the German Army invaded France and the brigade was instead sent, in mid-May, to Calais, France, where, despite fighting bravely for several days, the 30th Brigade, along with most of the battalion, including Williams and Miller, the battalion's Commanding Officer (CO), was forced to surrender, most spending the rest of the conflict as a prisoner of war (POW).

Williams, however, managed to escape and, after returning to the United Kingdom, was awarded the Military Cross (MC), for "gallant and distinguished services in recent operations", on 3 September and was made a General Staff Officer Grade 2 (GSO2) at the Senior Officers' School, before being made a brigade major in late July 1942. In mid-December he was made a GSO2 with the HQ of the British First Army, commanded by Lieutenant-General Kenneth Anderson. The army was then serving in French North Africa, having landed there as part of Operation Torch some five weeks earlier. Williams remained in this post through most of the rest of the Tunisian Campaign until, in mid-April 1943, he was made a GSO1 with a division. Upon relinquishing this appointment six months later, he was, in late January 1944, given a field command, and became CO of the 1st Battalion, KRRC. The battalion was serving in North Africa as the motorised infantry element of Brigadier Richard Goodbody's 2nd Armoured Brigade, itself part of the 1st Armoured Division, then under Major-General Alexander Galloway. On 3 February Williams was mentioned in despatches for his services. The battalion was training for eventual participation in the Italian campaign.

Williams landed in Italy with his battalion, and most of the rest of the 1st Armoured Division, in late May 1944. In late June the battalion was transferred to the 9th Armoured Brigade, before returning to the 2nd Armoured Brigade and taking part in severe fighting in front of the Gothic Line. Williams commanded the battalion throughout most of the battalion's service in Italy until, in March 1945, he was promoted to the acting rank of brigadier (and colonel on the same date) and was posted to Allied Forces Headquarters (AFHQ), before being made a GSO1 with HQ Central Mediterranean Force from October until December 1946.

After the War he became Assistant Adjutant-General at the War Office and then, from 1954, Commanding Officer of 2nd Bn the King's Royal Rifle Corps. He was appointed Commander of 2nd Infantry Brigade in 1956, General Officer Commanding 2nd Division in 1960 and Chief of Staff at Headquarters Far East Land Forces in May 1962. His last appointments were as General Officer Commanding Singapore from November 1962 and Chairman of the Vehicle Committee at the Ministry of Defence from 1964 before retiring in 1965.

In 1970 he became High Sheriff of Dorset. He died on 2 November 1994, at the age of 84.

Family
In 1943 he married Sybilla Margaret Archdale. Their daughter Victoria Mary married Francis Egerton, 7th Duke of Sutherland, on 11 May 1974.

References

External links
British Army Officers 1939−1945
Generals of World War II
Imperial War Museum Interview

1910 births
1994 deaths
Graduates of the Royal College of Defence Studies
British Army major generals
British Army brigadiers of World War II
British escapees
British military personnel of the 1936–1939 Arab revolt in Palestine
British World War II prisoners of war
Commanders of the Order of the British Empire
Companions of the Order of the Bath
Deputy Lieutenants of Dorset
Escapees from German detention
Graduates of the Royal Military College, Sandhurst
High Sheriffs of Dorset
Joint Forces Staff College alumni
King's Royal Rifle Corps officers
People educated at Eton College
People from Dorchester, Dorset
Recipients of the Military Cross
World War II prisoners of war held by Germany
Military personnel from Dorset